The Rocca Borromeo di Angera, or Rocca d'Angera, also called Borromeo Castle, is a castle on a lakeside hilltop in the limits of the town of Angera in the Province of Varese on the Southern shores of Lago Maggiore. It is visible from across the lake from Arona, where originally stood another castle formerly owned by the Borromeo family.

History

Situated on a lime rockspur on the Lombard shore of Lago Maggiore, the fortress faces that of Arona, Piedmont. It controlled almost the entire body of water, a large portion of the territory of Varese, at a strategic junction with the river Ticino. The Visconti of Milan started construction of the castle in the 1100s and its current form was built between the thirteenth and fourteenth centuries.

The Della Torre family had besieged the castle over and over again, destroying it considerably. After the Battle of Desio in 1277, the Torriani lost it to the Visconti, beginning with Bernabò Visconti and his wife, Beatrice della Scala. In 1449, the castle was purchased by the Borromeo family who expanded and refurbished the castle over the centuries up until the present day. The castle suffered damage during a bombardment in the second world war.

Museum premises
Passing the gates one enters the inner courtyard (Corte Nobile), which is paved with pebble stones. One of the largest preserved wine presses is on display there.

The castle is best known for its Hall of Justice (Sala di Giustizia) which contains original late 13th century frescoes, signed by the anonymous "Master of Angera", depicting the victory of Ottone Visconti, archbishop of Milan, at the Battle of Desio. 
Two rooms contain frescoes by late Gothic painters of the Lombard School, refurbished between 2013 and 2015, the Sala dei Ceremonie and the Sala dei Fasti Borromeo (Splendour Hall). The latter contains two large 17th-century paintings glorifying the Borromeo family. The castle tower offers a 360-degree view of the Southern lake region.
  
The castle also contains a Museo della Bambola (doll museum), founded in 1988 by Princess Bona Borromeo Arese, displaying over a thousand dolls from all over the world made between the 18th century and the present day.

According to the owners, a medieval garden was started on the lakeside of the castle in 2008, organized into various zones with edible, medicinal plants and aromatic herbs growing in raised beds, as well as a vineyard.

Gallery

References

External links

Rocca Borromeo - complesso Copyright Regione Lombardia

Buildings and structures completed in the 13th century
Castles in Lombardy